Joseph Octave Mousseau (April 25, 1844 – December 13, 1898) was a physician and political figure in Quebec. He represented Soulanges in the House of Commons of Canada from 1891 to 1892 as an Independent member.

He was born in Berthier, Canada East, the son of Louis Mousseau, who was the son of Alexis Mousseau, and Sophie Duteau, dit Grandpré. Mousseau was educated at Montreal and Nicolet. He served on the town council for Saint-Polycarpe and also served as mayor. Mousseau married Marie Rose-Avelina Cadieux. He ran unsuccessfully for a seat in the House of Commons in 1887. His election to the House of Commons in 1891 was overturned in 1892 and he was defeated by James William Bain in the two by-elections which followed.

He was the brother of Joseph-Alfred Mousseau. His son Joseph-Octave was a member of the Quebec legislative assembly.

References 
 
The Canadian parliamentary companion, 1891 JA Gemmill

1844 births
1898 deaths
Members of the House of Commons of Canada from Quebec
Mayors of places in Quebec